The 2022 China-Arab States Summit was the 1st summit of the heads of state and representatives of 21 countries of the Arab League, and the head of state of the People's Republic of China. It was held on 9 December 2022, in Riyadh, Saudi Arabia.

See also
China–Arab States Cooperation Forum

References

2022 in international relations
2022 in China
21st century in Riyadh
December 2022 events in Saudi Arabia
Foreign relations of China
International conferences
Arab League summits
Events in Saudi Arabia
China–Saudi Arabia relations